This is a history of the progression of the world record for the 200-meter backstroke event.  It is a listing of the fastest-time-ever swum in the event, in both long course (50-meter) and short course (25-meter) swimming pools.  These records are maintained/recognized by FINA, which oversees international competitive swimming and aquatics.

The long course records are historically older than the short course records; the latter having only been recognized since the early 1990s.

Men

Long course

Old regulations

New regulations

Short course

Women

Long course

Old Regulations

New Regulations

Short course

All-time top 25

Men long course
Correct as of December 2022

Notes
Below is a list of other times equal or superior to 1:55.54:
Ryosuke Irie also swam 1:52.86 (2009), 1:53.26 (2014), 1:53.73 (2009), 1:53.78 (2012), 1:53.91 (2014), 1:54.02 (2009, 2012), 1:54.03 (2012), 1:54.08 (2011), 1:54.09 (2009), 1:54.11 (2011), 1:54.13 (2009), 1:54.14 (2009), 1:54.34 (2011), 1:54.36 (2009), 1:54.54 (2011), 1:54.55 (2011), 1:54.62 (2011, 2015), 1:54.63 (2014), 1:54.72 (2013), 1:54.74 (2009), 1:54.77 (2008), 1:54.80 (2012), 1:54.81 (2014, 2015), 1:54.91 (2014), 1:54.93 (2015), 1:54.97 (2014), 1:55.05 (2012), 1:55.07 (2013), 1:55.10 (2014), 1:55.11 (2018), 1:55.12 (2018), 1:55.14 (2014), 1:55.20 (2009), 1:55.21 (2010), 1:55.23 (2015), 1:55.35 (2020), 1:55.36 (2015), 1:55.38 (2015), 1:55.39 (2013), 1:55.45 (2010), 1:55.50 (2013), 1:55.51 (2018), 1:55.52 (2010, 2021).
Aaron Peirsol also swam 1:53.08 (2009), 1:54.06 (2009), 1:54.32 (2008), 1:54.33 (2008), 1:54.44 (2006), 1:54.66 (2005), 1:54.74 (2004), 1:54.77 (2007), 1:54.80 (2007), 1:54.95 (2004), 1:55.13 (2005), 1:55.14 (2004), 1:55.15 (2002), 1:55.26 (2008), 1:55.33 (2004), 1:55.46 (2007).
Evgeny Rylov also swam 1:53.27 (2021), 1:53.36 (2018), 1:53.40 (2019), 1:53.61 (2017), 1:53.71 (2018), 1:53.81 (2017), 1:53.97 (2016), 1:54.00 (2019), 1:54.21 (2016), 1:54.45 (2016, 2021), 1:54.46 (2021), 1:54.60 (2015), 1:54.76 (2016), 1:54.96 (2017), 1:55.02 (2016), 1:55.11 (2021), 1:55.34 (2021), 1:55.43 (2016), 1:55.48 (2019), 1:55.50 (2018), 1:55.54 (2015).
Mitch Larkin also swam 1:53.34 (2015), 1:53.58 (2015), 1:53.72 (2015), 1:53.80 (2015), 1:53.90 (2016), 1:53.96 (2016), 1:54.29 (2015), 1:54.38 (2021), 1:54.68 (2016), 1:54.73 (2016), 1:55.03 (2019), 1:55.08 (2016), 1:55.16 (2016), 1:55.26 (2014), 1:55.27 (2014), 1:55.31 (2016), 1:55.38 (2016), 1:55.40 (2018), 1:55.52 (2015).
Ryan Murphy also swam 1:53.62 (2016), 1:53.95 (2016), 1:54.07 (2018), 1:54.12 (2019), 1:54.15 (2018, 2021), 1:54.20 (2021), 1:54.21 (2017), 1:54.30 (2017), 1:54.52 (2022), 1:54.93 (2017), 1:54.94 (2016), 1:55.00 (2015), 1:55.01 (2022), 1:55.04 (2016), 1:55.10 (2015), 1:55.15 (2016), 1:55.22 (2020), 1:55.38 (2021), 1:55.43 (2022), 1:55.46 (2018).
Ryan Lochte also swam 1:53.79 (2013), 1:53.82 (2009), 1:53.94 (2008, 2012), 1:54.12 (2010), 1:54.21 (2009), 1:54.32 (2007), 1:54.34 (2008), 1:54.54 (2012), 1:55.16 (2013), 1:55.26 (2010), 1:55.39 (2009), 1:55.40 (2008, 2012).
Xu Jiayu also swam 1:54.03 (2017), 1:54.79 (2016, 2017), 1:55.04 (2017), 1:55.05 (2014), 1:55.11 (2014), 1:55.13 (2015), 1:55.16 (2016), 1:55.19 (2016), 1:55.20 (2015), 1:55.24 (2019), 1:55.26 (2017, 2020), 1:55.42 (2017), 1:55.43 (2018), 1:55.51 (2016).
Tyler Clary also swam 1:54.53 (2009), 1:54.64 (2013), 1:54.69 (2011), 1:54.71 (2012), 1:54.73 (2014), 1:54.88 (2012), 1:54.90 (2010), 1:54.91 (2014), 1:55.16 (2013), 1:55.33 (2016), 1:55.37 (2009).
Radosław Kawęcki also swam 1:54.55 (2015), 1:55.28 (2012), 1:55.54 (2015).
Luke Greenbank also swam 1:54.62 (2021), 1:54.63 (2021), 1:54.67 (2021), 1:54.72 (2021), 1:54.98 (2021), 1:55.16 (2022), 1:55.34 (2021).
Kosuke Hagino also swam 1:54.77 (2014), 1:55.12 (2013), 1:55.43 (2013).
Jacob Pebley also swam 1:54.78 (2017), 1:54.92 (2016), 1:55.06 (2017), 1:55.18 (2016), 1:55.20 (2017), 1:55.52 (2016).
Nick Thoman also swam 1:54.83 (2009).
Arkady Vyatchanin also swam 1:54.90 (2009), 1:54.93 (2008), 1:55.30 (2014), 1:55.33 (2014), 1:55.44 (2006).
Aschwin Wildeboer also swam 1:54.96 (2009).
Kliment Kolesnikov also swam 1:55.15 (2017), 1:55.49 (2017).
Michael Phelps also swam 1:55.30 (2004).
Stanislav Donets also swam 1:55.36 (2009).
Shaine Casas also swam 1:55.46 (2022).
Bryce Mefford also swam 1:55.49 (2021).

Men short course
Correct as of December 2022

Notes
Below is a list of other times equal or superior to 1:49.23:
Arkady Vyatchanin also swam 1:46.41 (2009), 1:47.66 (2009), 1:48.69 (2009).
Evgeny Rylov also swam 1:47.02 (2018), 1:47.88 (2021), 1:48.31 (2020), 1:48.62 (2020), 1:48.69 (2020), 1:48.91 (2019), 1:49.22 (2020).
Mitch Larkin also swam 1:47.41 (2016), 1:47.72 (2014), 1:48.25 (2018), 1:48.31 (2016), 1:48.35 (2014), 1:48.51 (2018), 1:48.69 (2014), 1:48.78 (2015), 1:48.81 (2016), 1:49.07 (2018), 1:49.15 (2019).
Ryan Murphy also swam 1:47.41 (2020, 2022), 1:47.48 (2020), 1:48.03 (2020), 1:48.10 (2021), 1:48.12 (2021), 1:48.40 (2020), 1:48.43 (2021), 1:48.60 (2020), 1:48.73 (2020), 1:48.81 (2020), 1:48.86 (2012).
Radosław Kawęcki also swam 1:47.63 (2013, 2016), 1:47.90 (2020), 1:48.12 (2020), 1:48.20 (2017), 1:48.23 (2020), 1:48.25 (2018), 1:48.32 (2015), 1:48.33 (2015), 1:48.46 (2017, 2021), 1:48.48 (2012), 1:48.51 (2012, 2020, 2020), 1:48.54 (2013), 1:48.68 (2021), 1:48.79 (2020), 1:48.86 (2020), 1:48.93 (2013), 1:48.96 (2017), 1:49.08 (2016), 1:49.13 (2009), 1:49.15 (2011).
Markus Rogan also swam 1:47.84 (2008), 1:48.14 (2009).
Ryan Lochte also swam 1:47.91 (2008), 1:48.20 (2014), 1:48.50 (2012), 1:48.90 (2011), 1:49.05 (2006).
George Du Rand also swam 1:48.05 (2009), 1:48.95 (2009).
Shaine Casas also swam 1:48.40 (2022), 1:48.81 (2021), 1:48.99 (2022).
lorenzo Mora also swam 1:48.72 (2022).
Matt Grevers also swam 1:48.97 (2015).
Christian Diener also swam 1:49.04 (2021), 1:49.14 (2014).
Kliment Kolesnikov also swam 1:49.06 (2020).
Masaki Kaneko also swam 1:49.11 (2017), 1:49.18 (2016).
Ryosuke Irie also swam 1:49.18 (2020).
Stanislav Donets also swam 1:49.22 (2008).

Women long course
Correct as of March 2023

Notes
Below is a list of other times equal or superior to 2:06.82:
Regan Smith also swam 2:03.69 (2019), 2:05.28 (2022), 2:05.34 (2023), 2:05.65 (2022), 2:05.94 (2020), 2:06.01 (2019), 2:06.16 (2020), 2:06.43 (2018), 2:06.46 (2018), 2:06.47 (2019), 2:06.79 (2021).
Kaylee McKeown also swam 2:04.28 (2021), 2:04.31 (2021), 2:04.49 (2020), 2:04.64 (2022), 2:04.68 (2021), 2:05.08 (2022), 2:05.16 (2020), 2:05.31 (2022), 2:05.51 (2021), 2:05.55 (2021), 2:05.60 (2022), 2:05.66 (2021), 2:05.83 (2020), 2:05.85 (2022), 2:06.26 (2019), 2:06.35 (2019), 2:06.38 (2020), 2:06.41 (2022), 2:06.76 (2017).
Missy Franklin also swam 2:04.76 (2013), 2:05.10 (2011), 2:05.68 (2013), 2:05.90 (2011), 2:06.12 (2012), 2:06.33 (2013), 2:06.34 (2015), 2:06.46 (2013).
Phoebe Bacon also swam 2:05.12 (2022), 2:05.93 (2022), 2:06.40 (2021), 2:06.46 (2021), 2:06.78 (2022).
Kirsty Coventry also swam 2:05.24 (2008), 2:05.86 (2009), 2:06.39 (2008), 2:06.72 (2009), 2:06.76 (2008).
Margherita Panziera also swam 2:05.72 (2019), 2:06.08 (2021), 2:06.18 (2018), 2:06.41 (2019), 2:06.59 (2019), 2:06.62 (2019), 2:06.64 (2019), 2:06.67 (2019).
Rhyan White also swam 2:05.73 (2021), 2:06.39 (2021), 2:06.96 (2022).
Emily Seebohm also swam 2:05.81 (2015, 2017), 2:06.17 (2021), 2:06.38 (2021), 2:06.56 (2015), 2:06.59 (2016), 2:06.66 (2017), 2:06.69 (2015), 2:06.82 (2018).
Anastasia Fesikova also swam 2:05.92 (2012), 2:06.59 (2012).
Kylie Masse also swam 2:05.94 (2019), 2:05.97 (2017), 2:05.98 (2018), 2:06.57 (2019), 2:06.62 (2019), 2:06.67 (2021).
Katinka Hosszú also swam 2:06.03 (2016), 2:06.05 (2016), 2:06.09 (2016), 2:06.18 (2015), 2:06.81 (2015).
Margaret Hoelzer also swam 2:06.23 (2008).
Kathleen Baker also swam 2:06.38 (2017), 2:06.43 (2018), 2:06.46 (2020), 2:06.48 (2017), 2:06.66 (2017), 2:06.82 (2017).
Elizabeth Beisel also swam 2:06.39 (2009), 2:06.55 (2012).
Belinda Hocking also swam 2:06.40 (2014), 2:06.49 (2016), 2:06.66 (2013), 2:06.68 (2012).
Taylor Ruck also swam 2:06.41 (2018), 2:06.42 (2018), 2:06.70 (2019).

Women short course
Correct as of December 2022

Notes
Below is a list of other times equal or superior to 2:01.67:
Kaylee McKeown also swam 1:59.26 (2022), 1:59.48 (2022).
Minna Atherton also swam 1:59.48 (2019), 2:00.58 (2019), 2:01.59 (2019).
Katinka Hosszú also swam 1:59.75 (2015), 1:59.84 (2015), 1:59.95 (2015), 2:00.05 (2017), 2:00.18 (2017), 2:00.37 (2017), 2:00.52 (2016), 2:00.53 (2017), 2:00.79 (2016), 2:00.85 (2014), 2:01.00 (2018), 2:01.17 (2014), 2:01.24 (2016), 2:01.48 (2016), 2:01.59 (2017), 2:01.60 (2014), 2:01.66 (2016).
Emily Seebohm also swam 1:59.94 (2018), 2:00.13 (2014), 2:00.65 (2017), 2:01.04 (2020), 2:01.13 (2018), 2:01.15 (2017), 2:01.16 (2020), 2:01.37 (2018), 2:01.41 (2017), 2:01.56 (2020), 2:01.58 (2016), 2:01.60 (2018).
Missy Franklin also swam 2:00.14 (2011), 2:01.53 (2015).
Beata Nelson also swam 2:00.33 (2021), 2:00.43 (2022), 2:01.31 (2020), 2:01.65 (2020).
Daryna Zevina also swam 2:00.47 (2016), 2:00.75 (2016), 2:00.81 (2013), 2:00.97 (2016), 2:01.17 (2013), 2:01.25 (2016), 2:01.47 (2013), 2:01.61 (2016), 2:01.62 (2013), 2:01.66 (2013).
Kathleen Baker also swam 2:00.79 (2018), 2:00.85 (2018), 2:01.22 (2019), 2:01.57 (2019).
Elizabeth Simmonds also swam 2:00.91 (2015), 2:01.48 (2009).
Lisa Bratton also swam 2:00.99 (2020), 2:01.00 (2018), 2:01.61 (2020).
Belinda Hocking also swam 2:01.30 (2011).
Kylie Masse also swam 2:01.45 (2021).
Margherita Panziera also swam 2:01.56 (2018).
Amy Bilquist also swam 2:01.61 (2019).

References

Backstroke 200 metres
World record progression 200 metres backstroke